In neuroscience, glutamate refers to the anion of glutamic acid in its role as a neurotransmitter: a chemical that nerve cells use to send signals to other cells.  It is by a wide margin the most abundant excitatory neurotransmitter in the vertebrate nervous system. It is used by every major excitatory function in the vertebrate brain, accounting in total for well over 90% of the synaptic connections in the human brain. It also serves as the primary neurotransmitter for some localized brain regions, such as cerebellum granule cells.

Biochemical receptors for glutamate fall into three major classes, known as AMPA receptors, NMDA receptors, and metabotropic glutamate receptors. A fourth class, known as kainate receptors, are similar in many respects to AMPA receptors, but much less abundant. Many synapses use multiple types of glutamate receptors. AMPA receptors are ionotropic receptors specialized for fast excitation:  in many synapses they produce excitatory electrical responses in their targets a fraction of a millisecond after being stimulated.  NMDA receptors are also ionotropic, but they differ from AMPA receptors in being permeable, when activated, to calcium.  Their properties make them particularly important for learning and memory. Metabotropic receptors act through second messenger systems to create slow, sustained effects on their targets.

Because of its role in synaptic plasticity, glutamate is involved in cognitive functions such as  learning and memory in the brain.  The form of plasticity known as long-term potentiation takes place at glutamatergic synapses in the hippocampus, neocortex, and other parts of the brain.  Glutamate works not only as a point-to-point transmitter, but also through spill-over synaptic crosstalk between synapses in which summation of glutamate released from a neighboring synapse creates extrasynaptic signaling/volume transmission.  In addition, glutamate plays important roles in the regulation of growth cones and synaptogenesis during brain development.

Biosynthesis
Glutamate is a very major constituent of a wide variety of proteins; consequently it is one of the most abundant amino acids in the human body. Glutamate is formally classified as a non-essential amino acid, because it can be synthesized (in sufficient quantities for health) from α-ketoglutaric acid, which is produced as part of the citric acid cycle by a series of reactions whose starting point is citrate. Glutamate cannot cross the blood–brain barrier unassisted, but it is actively transported out of the nervous system by a high affinity transport system, which maintains its concentration in brain fluids at a fairly constant level.

Glutamate is synthesized in the central nervous system from glutamine as part of the glutamate–glutamine cycle by the enzyme glutaminase. This can occur in the presynaptic neuron or in neighboring glial cells.

Glutamate itself serves as metabolic precursor for the neurotransmitter GABA, via the action of the enzyme glutamate decarboxylase.

Cellular effects

Glutamate exerts its effects by binding to and activating cell surface receptors. In mammals, four families of glutamate receptors have been identified, known as AMPA receptors, kainate receptors, NMDA receptors, and metabotropic glutamate receptors.  The first three families are ionotropic, meaning that when activated they open membrane channels that allow ions to pass through. The metabotropic family are G protein-coupled receptors, meaning that they exert their effects via a complex second messenger system.

Disease, disabilities, and pharmacology
Glutamate transporters, EAAT and VGLUT, are found in neuronal and glial membranes. They rapidly remove glutamate from the extracellular space. In brain injury or disease, they often work in reverse, and excess glutamate can accumulate outside cells. This process causes calcium ions to enter cells via NMDA receptor channels, leading to neuronal damage and eventual cell death, and is called excitotoxicity. The mechanisms of cell death include

 Ca2+-concentration regulates different mitochondrial functions and upon increasing uncontrollably, the excessively high intracellular Ca2+-concentration can damage mitochondria.
 Ca2+-concentration increases intracellular nitric oxide (NO) concentration. Excessive NO-molecules form free radicals and thus increase cell's oxidative stress.
 Glutamate or Ca2+ mediate promotion of transcription factors for pro-apoptotic genes, or downregulation of transcription factors for anti-apoptotic genes. Thus the net effect of increased Glu/Ca2+-concentration is cell apoptosis.

Excitotoxicity due to excessive glutamate release and impaired uptake occurs as part of the ischemic cascade and is associated with stroke, autism, some forms of intellectual disability, and diseases such as  amyotrophic lateral sclerosis, lathyrism, and Alzheimer's disease. In contrast, decreased glutamate release is observed under conditions of classical phenylketonuria  leading to developmental disruption of glutamate receptor expression.

Glutamic acid has been implicated in epileptic seizures. Microinjection of glutamic acid into neurons produces spontaneous depolarisations around one second apart, and this firing pattern is similar to what is known as paroxysmal depolarizing shift in epileptic attacks. This change in the resting membrane potential at seizure foci could cause spontaneous opening of voltage-activated calcium channels, leading to glutamic acid release and further depolarization.

Comparative biology and evolution
Glutamate functions as a neurotransmitter in every type of animal that has a nervous system, including ctenophores (comb jellies), which branched off from other phyla at an early stage in evolution and lack the other neurotransmitters found ubiquitously among animals, including serotonin and acetylcholine. Rather, ctenophores have functionally distinct types of ionotropic glutamate receptors,  such that activation of these receptors may trigger muscle contraction and other responses.

Sponges do not have a nervous system, but also make use of glutamate for cell-to-cell signalling.  Sponges possess metabotropic glutamate receptors, and application of glutamate to a sponge can trigger a whole-body response that sponges use to rid themselves of contaminants. The genome of Trichoplax, a primitive organism that also lacks a nervous system, contains numerous metabotropic glutamate receptors, but their function is not yet known.

In arthropods and nematodes, glutamate stimulates glutamate-gated chloride channels.  The β subunits of the receptor respond with very high affinity to glutamate and glycine. Targeting these receptors has been the therapeutic goal of anthelmintic therapy using avermectins.  Avermectins target the alpha subunit of glutamate-gated chloride channels with high affinity. These receptors have also been described in arthropods, such as Drosophila melanogaster and Lepeophtheirus salmonis. Irreversible activation of these receptors with avermectins results in hyperpolarization at synapses and neuromuscular junctions resulting in flaccid paralysis and death of nematodes and arthropods.

History
The presence of glutamate in every part of the body as a building-block for protein made its special role in the nervous system difficult to recognize: its function as a neurotransmitter was not generally accepted until the 1970s, decades after the identification of acetylcholine, norepinephrine, and serotonin as neurotransmitters. The first suggestion that glutamate might function as a transmitter came from T. Hayashi in 1952, who was motivated by the finding that injections of glutamate into the cerebral ventricles of dogs could cause them to have seizures.
Other support for this idea soon appeared, but the majority of physiologists were skeptical, for a variety of theoretical and empirical reasons.  One of the most common reasons for skepticism was the universality of glutamate's excitatory effects in the central nervous system, which seemed inconsistent with the specificity expected of a neurotransmitter.  Other reasons for skepticism included a lack of known antagonists and the absence of a known mechanism for inactivation.  A series of discoveries during the 1970s resolved most of these doubts, and by 1980 the compelling nature of the evidence was almost universally recognized.

References 

 
Migraine